Anita Meiland (born 12 November 1967) is a Dutch rower. She competed in the women's quadruple sculls event at the 1992 Summer Olympics.

References

External links
 

1967 births
Living people
Dutch female rowers
Olympic rowers of the Netherlands
Rowers at the 1992 Summer Olympics
Sportspeople from Haarlem